Gustavo Pizarro (24 April 1916 – 22 December 1989) was a Chilean footballer. He played in four matches for the Chile national football team in 1939. He was also part of Chile's squad for the 1939 South American Championship.

References

External links
 

1916 births
1989 deaths
Chilean footballers
Chile international footballers
Place of birth missing
Association football forwards
Badminton F.C. footballers